The Millennium Prize Problems are seven well-known complex mathematical problems selected by the Clay Mathematics Institute in 2000. The Clay Institute has pledged a US$1 million prize for the first correct solution to each problem. 

The Clay Mathematics Institute officially designated the title Millennium Problem for the seven unsolved mathematical problems, the Birch and Swinnerton-Dyer conjecture, Hodge conjecture, Navier–Stokes existence and smoothness, P versus NP problem, Riemann hypothesis, Yang–Mills existence and mass gap, and Poincaré conjecture at the Millennium Meeting held on May 24, 2000. Thus, on the official website of the Clay Mathematics Institute, these seven problems are officially called the Millennium Problems.

To date, the only Millennium Prize problem to have been solved is the Poincaré conjecture. The Clay Institute awarded the monetary prize to Russian mathematician Grigori Perelman in 2010. However, he declined the award as it was not also offered to Richard S. Hamilton, upon whose work Perelman built.

The remaining six unsolved problems are the Birch and Swinnerton-Dyer conjecture, Hodge conjecture, Navier–Stokes existence and smoothness, P versus NP problem, Riemann hypothesis, and Yang–Mills existence and mass gap.

Overview
The Clay Institute was inspired by a set of twenty-three problems organized by the mathematician David Hilbert in 1900 which, despite having no monetary value, were highly influential in driving the progress of mathematics in the twentieth century. The seven selected problems range over a number of mathematical fields, namely algebraic geometry, arithmetic geometry, geometric topology, mathematical physics, number theory, partial differential equations, and theoretical computer science. Unlike Hilbert's problems, the problems selected by the Clay Institute were already renowned among professional mathematicians, with many actively  working towards their resolution.

Grigori Perelman, who had begun work on the Poincaré conjecture in the 1990s, released his proof in 2002 and 2003. His refusal of the Clay Institute's monetary prize in 2010 was widely covered in the media. The other six Millennium Prize Problems remain unsolved, despite a large number of unsatisfactory proofs by both amateur and professional mathematicians.

Andrew Wiles, as part of the Clay Institute's scientific advisory board, hoped that the choice of US$1 million prize money would popularize, among general audiences, both the selected problems as well as the "excitement of mathematical endeavor". Another board member, Fields medalist Alain Connes, hoped that the publicity around the unsolved problems would help to combat the "wrong idea" among the public that mathematics would be "overtaken by computers".

Some mathematicians have been more critical. Anatoly Vershik characterized their monetary prize as "show business" representing the "worst manifestations of present-day mass culture", and thought that there are more meaningful ways to invest in public appreciation of mathematics. He viewed the superficial media treatments of Perelman and his work, with disproportionate attention being placed on the prize value itself, as unsurprising. By contrast, Vershik praised the Clay Institute's direct funding of research conferences and young researchers. Vershik's comments were later echoed by Fields medalist Shing-Tung Yau, who was additionally critical of the idea of a foundation taking actions to "appropriate" fundamental mathematical questions and "attach its name to them".

Solved problem

Poincaré conjecture

In the field of geometric topology, a two-dimensional sphere is characterized by the fact that it is the only closed and simply-connected two-dimensional surface. In 1904, Henri Poincaré posed the question of whether an analogous statement holds true for three-dimensional shapes. This came to be known as the Poincaré conjecture, the precise formulation of which states: 
Although the conjecture is usually stated in this form, it is equivalent (as was discovered in the 1950s) to pose it in the context of smooth manifolds and diffeomorphisms.

A proof of this conjecture, together with the more powerful geometrization conjecture, was given by Grigori Perelman in 2002 and 2003. Perelman's solution completed Richard Hamilton's program for the solution of the geometrization conjecture, which he had developed over the course of the prior twenty years. Hamilton and Perelman's work revolved around Hamilton's Ricci flow, which is a complicated system of partial differential equations defined in the field of Riemannian geometry.

For his contributions to the theory of Ricci flow, Perelman was awarded the Fields medal in 2006. However, he declined to accept the prize. For his proof of the Poincaré conjecture, Perelman was awarded the Millennium Prize on March 18, 2010, but he declined the award and the associated prize money. The Interfax news agency quoted Perelman as saying he believed the prize was unfair, as he considered his contribution to solving the Poincaré conjecture to be no greater than Hamilton's.

Unsolved problems

Birch and Swinnerton-Dyer conjecture

The Birch and Swinnerton-Dyer conjecture deals with certain types of equations: those defining elliptic curves over the rational numbers. The conjecture is that there is a simple way to tell whether such equations have a finite or infinite number of rational solutions. Hilbert's tenth problem dealt with a more general type of equation, and in that case it was proven that there is no way to decide whether a given equation even has any solutions.

The official statement of the problem was given by Andrew Wiles.

Hodge conjecture

The Hodge conjecture is that for projective algebraic varieties, Hodge cycles are rational linear combinations of algebraic cycles.

We call this the group of Hodge classes of degree 2k on X.

The modern statement of the Hodge conjecture is:

Let X be a non-singular complex projective manifold.  Then every Hodge class on X is a linear combination with rational coefficients of the cohomology classes of complex subvarieties of X.

The official statement of the problem was given by Pierre Deligne.

Navier–Stokes existence and smoothness

The Navier–Stokes equations describe the motion of fluids, and are one of the pillars of fluid mechanics.  However, theoretical understanding of their solutions is incomplete, despite its importance in science and engineering. For the three-dimensional system of equations, and given some initial conditions, mathematicians have not yet proven that smooth solutions always exist. This is called the Navier–Stokes existence and smoothness problem. 

The problem, restricted to the case of an incompressible fluid, is to prove either that smooth, globally defined solutions exist that meet certain conditions, or that they do not always exist and the equations break down. The official statement of the problem was given by Charles Fefferman.

P versus NP

The question is whether or not, for all problems for which an algorithm can verify a given solution quickly (that is, in polynomial time), an algorithm can also find that solution quickly. Since the former describes the class of problems termed NP, while the latter describes P, the question is equivalent to asking whether all problems in NP are also in P. This is generally considered one of the most important open questions in mathematics and theoretical computer science as it has far-reaching consequences to other problems in mathematics, and to biology, philosophy and cryptography (see P versus NP problem proof consequences). A common example of an NP problem not known to be in P is the Boolean satisfiability problem.

Most mathematicians and computer scientists expect that P ≠ NP; however, it remains unproven.

The official statement of the problem was given by Stephen Cook.

Riemann hypothesis

The Riemann zeta function ζ(s) is a function whose argument s may be any complex number other than 1, and whose values are also complex. Its analytical continuation has zeros at the negative even integers; that is, ζ(s) = 0 when s is one of −2, −4, −6, .... These are called its trivial zeros. However, the negative even integers are not the only values for which the zeta function is zero. The other ones are called nontrivial zeros. The Riemann hypothesis is concerned with the locations of these nontrivial zeros, and states that:

The real part of every nontrivial zero of the Riemann zeta function is 1/2.

The Riemann hypothesis is that all nontrivial zeros of the analytical continuation of the Riemann zeta function have a real part of 1/2. A proof or disproof of this would have far-reaching implications in number theory, especially for the distribution of prime numbers. This was Hilbert's eighth problem, and is still considered an important open problem a century later.

The problem has been well-known ever since it was originally posed by Bernhard Riemann in 1860. The Clay Institute's exposition of the problem was given by Enrico Bombieri.

Yang–Mills existence and mass gap

In quantum field theory, the mass gap is the difference in energy between the vacuum and the next lowest energy state. The energy of the vacuum is zero by definition, and assuming that all energy states can be thought of as particles in plane-waves, the mass gap is the mass of the lightest particle.

For a given real field , we can say that the theory has a mass gap if the two-point function has the property

with  being the lowest energy value in the spectrum of the Hamiltonian and thus the mass gap. This quantity, easy to generalize to other fields, is what is generally measured in lattice computations.

Quantum Yang–Mills theory is the current grounding for the majority of theoretical applications of thought to the reality and potential realities of elementary particle physics. The theory is a generalization of the Maxwell theory of electromagnetism where the chromo-electromagnetic field itself carries charge. As a classical field theory it has solutions which travel at the speed of light so that its quantum version should describe massless particles (gluons). However, the postulated phenomenon of color confinement permits only bound states of gluons, forming massive particles. This is the mass gap. Another aspect of confinement is asymptotic freedom which makes it conceivable that quantum Yang-Mills theory exists without restriction to low energy scales. The problem is to establish rigorously the existence of the quantum Yang–Mills theory and a mass gap.

Existence includes establishing axiomatic properties at least as strong as those cited in Streater & Wightman (1964), Osterwalder & Schrader (1973), and Osterwalder & Schrader (1975).

The official statement of the problem was given by Arthur Jaffe and Edward Witten.

See also

 Beal's conjecture
 Hilbert's problems
 List of mathematics awards
 List of unsolved problems in mathematics
 Smale's problems
 Paul Wolfskehl (offered a cash prize for the solution to Fermat's Last Theorem)
ABC conjecture

References

Further reading

External links

 The Millennium Prize Problems

Challenge awards
 
Unsolved problems in mathematics